Matej Šavol (born 14 April 1984) is a Slovak football goalkeeper who currently plays for Fortuna Liga club MFK Ružomberok.

References
 MFK Ružomberok profile

External links
 
 Futbalnet profile
 Eurofotbal profile

1984 births
Living people
Slovak footballers
Association football goalkeepers
MFK Ružomberok players
MFK Tatran Liptovský Mikuláš players
FK Baník Most players
Slovak Super Liga players
Sportspeople from Ružomberok
Expatriate footballers in the Czech Republic